The Konami LaserScope is a head-mounted light gun used with and licensed for the Nintendo Entertainment System video game console. It was originally released in 1991 in Japan for the Famicom under the name Gun Sight.

It was designed for the game Laser Invasion (known as Gun Sight in Japan), but works with any game compatible with the NES Zapper. In the United States, Laser Invasion came with a coupon for a $5 discount for the LaserScope.

It is voice-activated, firing a shot whenever the wearer says "fire" (although some reviewers criticized its ability to do so). The headset also includes an eyepiece with a crosshair that sits in front of the wearer's right eye.

The LaserScope is powered through the audio port of the NES, allowing it to function as headphones for the NES.

Reception
The LaserScope received negative reviews for its poor microphone technology; users complained that saying anything into the microphone would cause the LaserScope to fire, including background noise. The complaint was humorized in James Rolfe's Angry Video Game Nerd series, in the episode "NES Accessories."

References

Nintendo Entertainment System accessories
Light guns